Camptogramma is a genus of moths in the family Geometridae erected by James Francis Stephens in 1831. It is considered by some to be a synonym of Euphyia.

Selected species
Camptogramma bilineata (Linnaeus, 1758) – yellow shell
 Camptogramma bilineata bilineata (Linnaeus, 1758)
 Camptogramma bilineata bohatschi (Aigner, 1902)
 Camptogramma bistrigata (Treitschke, 1828)
 Camptogramma grisescens (Staudinger, 1892)
 Camptogramma scripturata (Hübner, 1799)
 Camptogramma scripturata albidaria (Sohn-Rethel, 1929)
 Camptogramma scripturata placidaria (Freyer, 1852)
 Camptogramma scripturata poliata (Schawerda, 1913)
 Camptogramma scripturata rilica (Prout, 1938)
 Camptogramma scripturata scripturata (Hübner, 1799)

References

Euphyia